Simon Chandler (born 1953) is a British film, television and theatre actor. He often plays senior establishment figures such as Members of Parliament and senior civil servants.

Biography

Born in 1953 and educated at Bedford School, Chandler's acting career began in 1976. His first film role was as Private Simmonds in Richard Attenborough's 1977 film A Bridge Too Far and he provided the voice of Merry in Ralph Bakshi's 1978 animated film adaptation of The Lord of the Rings. His most prominent recent film work includes roles in Vera Drake (2004), Perfume: The Story of a Murderer (2006), The King's Speech (2010) and The Iron Lady (2011). He starred as Ade Rutter in the first series of House of Anubis and he has taken leading roles in Judge John Deed and other television dramas, as well as prominent theatre roles.

With an acting career spanning almost forty years, his other film and television credits include roles in Angels, Another Bouquet, Coronation Street, The Duchess of Duke Street, Just William, Lillie, Jackanory Playhouse, The Taming of the Shrew, Antony & Cleopatra, Brideshead Revisited, Dead Ernest, The Merry Wives of Windsor, Lace, C.A.T.S. Eyes, The Singing Detective, Jonny Briggs, Boon, Bergerac, Confessional, The Crown, Middlemarch, The Wimbledon Poisoner, Casualty, Silent Witness, Teachers, Heartbeat, Foyle's War, Holby City, The Bill, My Family, Midsomer Murders, Doctors, Land Girls, Life Force, Silk, Vera, Mr Selfridge and Spice World.

Partial filmography
A Bridge Too Far (1977) - Private Simmonds
The Lord of the Rings (1978) - Merry (voice)
If You Go Down in the Woods Today (1981) - Lieutenant
Victor Victoria (1982) - Chorus Boy
The Bounty (1984) - David Nelson
Hollow Reed (1996) - Mr. Bugler
The Man Who Knew Too Little (1997) - Hawkins
Incognito (1997) - Iain Hill
Spice World (1997) - Hospital Parent
The Commissioner (1998) - Peter Simpson
Milk (1999) - Doctor
The Stone Raft (2002) - Primer Ministro Ingles
Vera Drake (2004) - Mr. Wells
Mangal Pandey: The Rising (2005) - Lockwood
Stoned (2005) - Mary's Father
Perfume: The Story of a Murderer (2006) - Mayor of Grasse
Penelope (2006) - Doctor
The King's Speech (2010) - Lord Dawson
The Iron Lady (2011) - Cabinet Ministers
Fast Girls (2012) - GB Worlds Official
Mr. Turner (2014) - Sir Augustus Wall Callcott
The Theory of Everything (2014) - John Taylor
The Crown (2016) - Clement Attlee
House of the Dragon (2022) - Septon Eustace (Episode: "The Green Council")

References

External links

English male film actors
English male television actors
English male voice actors
Living people
People educated at Bedford School
20th-century English male actors
21st-century English male actors
1953 births